William IV (937 – 3 February 994), called Fierebras or Fierebrace (meaning "Proud Arm", from the French Fier-à-bras or Fièrebrace, in turn from the Latin Ferox brachium), was the Duke of Aquitaine and Count of Poitou from 963 to his retirement in 990.

William's father, William III, abdicated to the abbey of Saint-Cyprien in Poitiers and left the government to Fierebras. His mother was Gerloc, the daughter of Duke Rollo of Normandy. His sister was Adelaide, wife of Hugh Capet, the king against whom William later battled for his duchy. His early reign was characterised by many wars. He fought frequently against the counts of Anjou, the first time against Geoffrey Greymantle, who had taken Loudun.

In 988, he went to war with the newly elected king of France, Hugh Capet, whom he refused to recognise. Capet had been granted Aquitaine by King Lothair before the latter had been reconciled to William's father. Capet renewed his claim on the great duchy and invaded it that year. A royal army was defeated on the plain of the Loire Valley. William sheltered the young Louis, the son of Charles, Duke of Lower Lorraine, the last legitimate Carolingian heir. He opened the palace of Poitiers to him and treated him as royalty, regarding him as the true heir to the French throne.

In 968, he married Emma or Emmeline, daughter of Theobald I of Blois and Luitgarde of Vermandois. Their marriage was stormy, in part because of William's indulgence in the pursuit of women and, as a hunting aficionado, wild animals. She banished his paramours, they separated twice for long periods, and finally he retired to a monastery, as his father had done, leaving Emma to rule Aquitaine in the name of their son William until 1004. Their second son, Ebles, died sometime after 997.

Notes

Sources
Owen, D. D. R. Eleanor of Aquitaine, Queen and Legend. 1993.
Nouvelle Biographie Générale. Paris, 1859.

See also
Dukes of Aquitaine family tree

937 births
994 deaths
House of Poitiers
William 04 of Aquitaine
Counts of Poitiers
10th-century French people